Tyler Freeman (born January 9, 2003) is an American professional soccer player who plays as a forward for Nashville SC in the Major League Soccer.

Club career
Born in Overland Park, Kansas, Freeman joined the Sporting Kansas City youth academy in 2014. During his time with the academy, Freeman progressed through the club ranks, playing with the under-12s through to the under-19s.

On October 8, 2018, after scoring 17 goals for the under-17s, Freeman signed a professional homegrown player deal with Sporting Kansas City ahead of the 2019 season. He made his debut for the club's reserve side, Sporting Kansas City II, in the USL Championship on March 9, 2019 against New York Red Bulls II. Freeman started and played 67 minutes during the 3–1 defeat. He then scored his first professional goal on July 17 against Hartford Athletic, his goal being the fourth in a 4–3 victory. Throughout his first professional season, Freeman made a total of 17 appearances for Sporting Kansas City II, scoring the 1 goal. He also made appearance on the bench for the first-team during their 1–1 draw against FC Cincinnati on April 7.

In 2020, Freeman continued to play with Sporting Kansas City II, scoring two goals in nine matches during a Covid-19 affected season. He scored his first goal of the season on September 9 against Indy Eleven, a consolation 88th minute free kick goal during a 2–1 defeat.

On August 3, 2021 Freeman moved on loan to the under-19s of German 2. Bundesliga side Karlsruher SC until June 2022.

Sporting Kansas City recalled Freeman from his loan on January 14, 2022, ahead of the 2022 Major League Soccer season. He was waived one month later by the club.

On March 11, 2022, Freeman was signed by Loudoun United FC, the reserve team of D.C. United. On March 19, Freeman scored two goals in his second match for the club, a 3–0 win over New York Red Bulls II, earning him a player of the match honor.

On 3 January 2023, Freeman joined Major League Soccer side Nashville SC on a free transfer, signing a four-year contract with the club in the process.

International career
Freeman made his international debut for the United States under-17s on August 7, 2018 against Costa Rica U17, scoring a goal during the 2–2 draw.

Career statistics

References

External links
 Profile at Major League Soccer

2003 births
Living people
Sportspeople from the Kansas City metropolitan area
People from Shawnee, Kansas
American soccer players
Association football forwards
United States men's youth international soccer players
USL Championship players
Homegrown Players (MLS)
Sporting Kansas City players
Sporting Kansas City II players
Loudoun United FC players
Nashville SC players
Karlsruher SC players
Soccer players from Kansas
American expatriate soccer players in Germany